Elaine Beryl Jensen (born 18 March 1955 in Feilding, New Zealand) is a former field hockey goalkeeper from New Zealand, who finished in eighth position with the National Women's Team at the 1992 Summer Olympics in Barcelona.

References

External links
 

New Zealand female field hockey players
Female field hockey goalkeepers
Olympic field hockey players of New Zealand
Field hockey players at the 1992 Summer Olympics
1955 births
Living people
People from Feilding
20th-century New Zealand women
21st-century New Zealand women